Mand Raigarh Coalfield is located in Raigarh district in the Indian state of Chhattisgarh. It lies in the valley of the Mand River, a tributary of the Mahanadi.

The coalfield
Mand Raigarh Coalfield, along with Korba and Hasdo Arand Coalfields forms the South Chhattisgarh Coalfields. Mand Raigarh Coalfield includes the areas earlier known as North Raigarh, South Raigarh and Mand River Coalfields. Of at least twelve seams in the Mand Valley, the Mand and Taraimar seams are important.

The field has a potential for mining of power grade coal, much of which can be extracted through open cast mining. Gare block has been identified for captive mining by private companies.

According to the Geological Survey of India total reserves (including proved, indicated and inferred reserves) of non-coking coal in the Mand Raigarh Coalfield is 18,532.93 million tonnes. Out of this 13,868.20 million tonnes is up to depth of 300 metres, 4569.51 million tonnes is at a depth of 300-600 meres and 95.22 million tonnes is at a depth of 600–1200 m.

Operations

Baroud Open Cast Mine
Baroud Open Cast Mine of Mand Raigarh Coalfields, consisting of Baroud and Rai West geological fields, will produce 3.5 million tonnes per annum at peak levels. Raigarh, 45 km away is the nearest railhead.

Transport
The new coalfield Mand-Raigarh is being linked to Korba Coalfield. It will be subsequently connected to the Pendra Road-Amritpur line.

The Mand Raigarh Coalfield does not have a rail link (as of 2012). South Eastern Coalfields Limited will fund this project.

Power Plants
NTPC has planned to set up the 5 x 800 MW Lara Super Thermal Power Project in Raigarh district. Coal requirement will be met from Talaipalli coal block of Mand Raigarh Coalfield.

References

Coalfields of India
Energy in Chhattisgarh
Raigarh district
Mining in Chhattisgarh